Beartown is an unincorporated community in Caernarvon Township in Lancaster County, Pennsylvania, United States. Beartown is located at the intersection of U.S. Route 322 and Pool Forge Road/Narvon Road.

References

Unincorporated communities in Lancaster County, Pennsylvania
Unincorporated communities in Pennsylvania